Sünder ohne Zügel (German for "Unbridled Sinners") is the third album by the German folk metal band In Extremo. It was released in 2001 by Island Records.

Track listing 
 Wind (In Extremo) – 4:25
 Krummavísur (Jón Thoroddsen/Traditional music/In Extremo) – 3:48
 Lebensbeichte (life-shrift) (Carmina Burana, 11th or 12th century/In Extremo) – 4:40
 Merseburger Zaubersprüche II (Merseburg Incantations II) (unknown author, 9th or 10th century/In Extremo) – 4:24
 Stetit Puella (Carmina Burana, 11th or 12th century/In Extremo) – 4:05
 Vollmond (full moon) (François Villon, 15th century/CKay) – 3:46
 Die Gier (the greed) (In Extremo) – 4:03
 Omnia Sol Temperat (Carmina Burana, 11th or 12th century/In Extremo) – 4:15
 Le'or Chiyuchech (In Extremo/Neeman) – 3:11
 Der Rattenfänger (the Pied Piper [lit. the rat-catcher]) (Goethe/In Extremo) – 4:16
 Óskasteinar (Hildigunnur Halldórsdóttir/Traditional music/In Extremo) – 3:25
 Nature Nous Semont (Jean de Beaumont/In Extremo) – 4:32
 Unter dem Meer (under the sea) (In Extremo) – 5:13

Personnel 
 Das letzte Einhorn – vocals, harp, cittern
 Der Lange – guitar
 Die Lutter – bass, marine trumpet
 Der Morgenstern – drums, percussion, timpani, frame drum
 Dr. Pymonte – german bagpipes, shawm, flute, harp
 Flex der Biegsame – german bagpipes, shawm, flute
 Yellow Pfeiffer – german bagpipes, shawm, nyckelharpa

References 

2001 albums
In Extremo albums
Island Records albums
Metal Blade Records albums
Vertigo Records albums